Ericabatrachus is a genus of frogs in the family Petropedetidae endemic to the Bale Mountains in Ethiopia. It is monotypic, being represented by the single species Ericabatrachus baleensis, commonly known as the Bale Mountains frog.

Taxonomy
Ericabatrachus baleensis is monotypic within its genus. The phylogenetic relationships of this poorly known species have been debated, but molecular analyses place it the family Petropedetidae, instead of Phrynobatrachidae or Pyxicephalidae, where it has also been placed. Its sister taxon is Petropedetes.

Description
Bale Mountains frogs are small; adult males measure  in snout–vent length and females . Their fingers are not webbed and toes have rudimentary webbing. Adult males have well-defined femoral glands.

Habitat and conservation
Its natural habitats are grassy banks of small, fast-flowing streams in giant heath woodland and adjoining Schefflera-Hagenia
forest. It is critically endangered because its range is extremely small and the habitat is under threat from trampling of streams, deforestation, and settlement development, despite being located in the Bale Mountains National Park.

References

Petropedetidae
Monotypic amphibian genera
Amphibians of Ethiopia
Endemic fauna of Ethiopia
Bale Mountains
Fauna of the Ethiopian Highlands
Critically endangered fauna of Africa
Amphibians described in 1991
Taxonomy articles created by Polbot